William Francis Hoffman is an American playwright best known for his play Cal in Camo, which premiered off-Broadway at the Rattlestick Playwrights Theater and starred Katya Campbell, David Harbour, and Paul Wesley.

Career 
William's play Drift, was set to star Joe Pantoliano and premiere off-Broadway at New World Stages on March 16, 2020, but the production was suspended due to the COVID-19 pandemic.

References

External links 
 

Living people
Writers from Missouri
American dramatists and playwrights
People from Missouri
Year of birth missing (living people)